Đờn ca tài tử or nhạc tài tử (樂才子) is a genre of chamber music in the traditional music of southern Vietnam. Its instrumentation resembles that of the ca Huế style; additionally, modified versions of the European instruments guitar, violin, and steel guitar are used. Vọng cổ ("Longing for the Past") is one of the more popular tài tử melodies, and was composed in 1919 by songwriter ông Sáu Lầu, of Bạc Liêu Province in southern Vietnam.

Etymology
The term comes from the Sino-Vietnamese terms nhạc (樂, literally "music") and tài tử (才子, literally "virtuoso"; the original Chinese meaning was "gifted scholar").

See also
Guitar phím lõm
Vọng cổ
Cải lương
Vietnamese music

References

Trần Văn Khê/Nguyễn Thuyết Phong. "Vietnam." Grove Music online.

External links
"Huế and Tài Tử Music of Viet Nam: The Concept of Music and Social Organisation of Musicians", by Lê Tuấn Hùng

Vietnamese traditional theatre
Vietnamese music